Nicholas F. Forell (1923 – February 19, 1998) was a structural engineer and a leading authority in the development of modern earthquake safety design. He was a founder and former president of the San Francisco firm Forell/Elsesser Engineers.

Early life
Nicholas was born in Züllichau, Germany in 1923. In 1941, he immigrated to the United States and began living in New York City.

Military service
After the attack on Pearl Harbor, Nicholas joined the United States Army in 1942, and was assigned to the Signal Corps (United States Army)' Heavy Construction Battalion operating with British troops in Myanmar.

Education
Following the war, Nicholas was offered admission to the engineering program at Brown University, and he graduated in 1949. Shortly after graduation, he moved to San Francisco to begin his career at Sverdrup & Parcel.

Notable projects
 Pacific Gas & Electric Headquarters seismic retrofit
 San Francisco Museum of Modern Art seismic retrofit
 Berkeley Civic Center seismic retrofit
 Utah State Capitol historic seismic retrofits
 W. M. Keck Observatory seismic retrofits

Published works
 "Developments in earthquake design codes", 1981
 "Mexico earthquakes : Oaxaca - November 29, 1978, Guerrero", 1979

References

1923 births
1998 deaths
People from Sulechów
People from the Province of Brandenburg
German emigrants to the United States